The Sigi Schmid Coach of the Year Award is given by Major League Soccer to the best coach in any given season. The award has been given since the league's inception in 1996 and is determined by a vote from players, club personnel, and members of the media. Bruce Arena has won the award four times, more than any other coach.

The award was renamed in January 2019 for Sigi Schmid, the coach with the most league regular season wins and two-time award winner, shortly after his death.

Winners

See also
 List of Major League Soccer coaches

References

External links
List of winners

Coach

US
Awards established in 1996